It's Over may refer to:

Songs
"It's Over" (Electric Light Orchestra song), 1978
"It's Over" (Jesse McCartney song), 2008
"It's Over" (Jimmie Rodgers song), 1966
"It's Over" (Level 42 song), 1987
"It's Over" (Roy Orbison song), 1964
"It's Over" (Squeeze song), 1994
"It's Over", by Audio Adrenaline from Underdog
"It's Over", by Bachman–Turner Overdrive from Head On
"It's Over", by Badfinger from Straight Up
"It's Over", by Bic Runga from Birds
"It's Over", by Boz Scaggs from Silk Degrees
"It's Over", by The Cheetah Girls from The Cheetah Girls 2 soundtrack
"It's Over", by the Fire Theft from their self-titled album
"It's Over", by Freeway from Free at Last
"It's Over", by Ghostface Killah from The Pretty Toney Album
"It's Over", by John Legend from Evolver
"It's Over", by John Mayall & The Bluesbreakers from A Hard Road
"It's Over", by Kurupt from Space Boogie: Smoke Oddessey
"It's Over", by Montell Jordan from This Is How We Do It
"It's Over", by Prism from the self-titled album
"It's Over", by Sondre Lerche from Two Way Monologue
"It's Over", by Trapt from DNA
"It's Over", by White Lion from Mane Attraction
"It's Over", by Yes from 90125
"It's Over", by Steve Peregrin Took, recorded 1977 by Steve Took's Horns

See also
"Don't Dream It's Over", song by Crowded House, covered by Paul Young and Sixpence None the Richer
"Fool (If You Think It's Over)", song by Chris Rea, covered by Elkie Brooks
When It's Over (disambiguation)